Komsomolsky is a rural locality (a settlement) and the administrative center of Komsomolskoye Rural Settlement, Ramonsky District, Voronezh Oblast, Russia. The population was 926 as of 2010. There are 16 streets.

Geography 
Komsomolsky is located 17 km northwest of Ramon (the district's administrative centre) by road. Sergeyevskoye is the nearest rural locality.

References 

Rural localities in Ramonsky District